Morro Redondo (English: Rounded Hill) is a Brazilian municipality in the southern part of the state of Rio Grande do Sul. The population is 6,589 (2020 est.) in an area of 244.65 km². It is located 35 km (21.75 mi) from Pelotas.

Demographics

Much of the population have Portuguese origin mainly from the Azores and Germans mainly from Pomerania, the remainder were from Italy.

Climate and vegetation
Most of the area of the municipality are above 200 m (656.16 ft) of elevation.  A vegetation of this area is mainly composed of fields with low and herbaceous vegetation (pampa). Small groves of cultivated trees (Babylon willow, eucalyptus, pine, cypress, acacia, poplar and platanus) and native trees (Cockspur coral tree and araucaria angustifolia) are also found.

The climate is subtropical or temperate, with pleasant summers, cool winters and frequent frosts (with an average of 20 per year). The hottest month is January with an average temperature of 21.7 °C (71.06 °F), and the coldest month is July with an average temperature of 11.7 °C (53.06 °F). The wettest month is February, with 150 mm (5.9 in) of precipitation. The average annual temperature in the municipality is 16.7 °C (62.06 °F). The average annual precipitation is 1,400 mm (55.11 in).

References

External links
 Official website of the prefecture
 http://www.citybrazil.com.br/rs/morroredondo/ 

Municipalities in Rio Grande do Sul
Pelotas (micro-region)